Albert Ernest Clifford Young OAM (8 February 19222 November 2003) was an Australian potato farmer and athlete from Beech Forest, Victoria. He was best known for his unexpected win of the inaugural Sydney to Melbourne Ultramarathon in 1983 at 61 years of age.

Early life 
Born the eldest son and the third of seven children of Mary and Albert Ernest Young on 8 February 1922, Albert Ernest Clifford Young grew up on a farm in Beech Forest in southwestern Victoria. As a child, Young was forced to round up the stock on foot, as the family were very poor during the depression and could not afford horses.

Running and ultramarathons 
In 1979, at the age of 56, he competed in the Adidas Sun Superun  race which crossed the West Gate Bridge in Melbourne. He ran the race at a very respectable 64 minutes and was interviewed by the media.

Cliff then ran the Melbourne Marathon with a time of 3:21:41 in 1979. He would go on to compete in 1980, 1981, and 1982, setting a personal best of 3:02:53 in 1980, aged 58.

The attempt took place in Colac's Memorial Square. Reflecting on the failed attempt, Young wrote that he and his support team were inexperienced and ill-prepared.

The race was run between what were then Australia's two largest Westfield shopping centres: Westfield Parramatta in Sydney and Westfield Doncaster in Melbourne. Young arrived to compete in overalls and work boots, without his dentures (later saying that they rattled when he ran). He ran at a slow and loping pace and trailed the pack by a large margin at the end of the first day. While the other competitors stopped to sleep for six hours, Young kept running. He ran continuously for five days, taking the lead during the first night and eventually winning by 10 hours. Before running the race, he had told the press that he had previously run for two to three days straight rounding up sheep in gumboots. He said afterwards that during the race he imagined he was running after sheep trying to outrun a storm. All six competitors who finished the race broke the old record. Despite attempting the event again in later years, Young was unable to repeat this performance or claim victory again.

Young became very popular after this "tortoise and hare" feat, so much so that in Colac, Victoria, the Cliff Young Australian Six-Day Race was established that same year. In 1984, he was awarded the Medal of the Order of Australia "for long distance running". 

In 1997, at age 75, he made an attempt to beat Ron Grant's around-Australia record. He completed 6,520 kilometres of the 16,000-kilometre run, but had to pull out because his only crew member became ill.

In 2000, Young achieved a world age record in a six-day race in Victoria.

Personal life 

Young was a vegetarian from 1973 until his death. He lived at the family home with his mother and brother Sid. Cliff had never married, but after the 1983 race, at 62 years of age, he married 23-year-old Mary Howell. The race sponsor, Westfield, hosted the wedding for the entertainment of shoppers. Young and Howell divorced five years later. Renowned for his ungainly running style, Young ran more than 20,000 kilometres during his competitive career. After five years of illness and several strokes, he died of cancer at the age of 81 on 2 November 2003 at his home in Queensland.

A memorial in the shape of a gumboot in Beech Forest is dedicated to Young and the Cliff Young Drive and Cliff Young Park there are named after him.

"Young Shuffle" 
The "Young Shuffle" has been adopted by some ultramarathon runners because it expends less energy. At least three winners of the Sydney-to-Melbourne race were known to use the "Young Shuffle" to win the race. In 2010, comedian Hannah Gadsby named her Sydney Comedy Festival show "The Cliff Young Shuffle" in tribute.

Cliffy telemovie 
In May 2013, ABC1 broadcast Cliffy, a telemovie about Young's victorious 1983 run. The telemovie starred Kevin Harrington as Young, with his race support team played by Roy Billing as his coach Wally, Anne Tenney as his sister Eunice, and Joshua Hine as Paul. Krew Boylan featured as Mary Howell. Young's mother was played by Joan Sydney.

Young appeared briefly as himself in an episode (No. 479) of the television drama Prisoner: Cell Block H.

References

External links 
 
 Cliff Young Rest in Peace

1922 births
2003 deaths
Australian ultramarathon runners
Australian farmers
Deaths from cancer in Queensland
Otway Ranges
People from Victoria (Australia)
Recipients of the Medal of the Order of Australia
Australian male long-distance runners
Male ultramarathon runners